St. Jakob-Park is a Swiss sports stadium in Basel. It is the largest football venue in Switzerland and home to FC Basel. "Joggeli", as the venue is nicknamed by the locals, was originally built with a capacity of 33,433 seats. The capacity was increased to 42,500 for Euro 2008, which was hosted by Austria and Switzerland. After the tournament, a number of seats were removed, thus creating more space between them. The capacity was therefore reduced to 38,512 for Swiss Super League matches or 37,500 seats for international matches The maximum capacity for concerts is 40,000.

The stadium is named after the village of St. Jakob an der Birs, which stood on the site. The name "Joggeli" is the diminutive of "Jakob" in the local dialect, making it the equivalent of "Jake".

Overview
The stadium is divided into four main blocks, A, B, C and D, each block covering one side of the stadium, and block G, consisting of the upper balcony added later. St. Jakob Park is a fairly modern stadium; construction started on 13 December 1998, replacing the former St. Jakob Stadium. The re-opening game took place 15 March 2001.

The "Genossenschaft S.J.P" officially owns the stadium, while the stadium itself is managed by "Basel United". The stadium cost around CHF 220 million to build (US$132 million, €143 million in March 2001).

Within the stadium, there are 32 shops on three different floors, as well as two restaurants (the "Restaurant UNO" and "Hattrick Sports Bar"). It has parking spaces for 680 cars on two different floors.

The stadium can be reached either by bus, tram or train (the stadium has its own train station).

The stadium has been awarded 4 stars by UEFA, which is the highest number of stars that can be awarded to a stadium of that size.

In 2006, there was a riot after a match between FC Basel and FC Zürich. See 2006 Basel Hooligan Incident for more details.

UEFA Euro 2008

For UEFA Euro 2008, the St. Jakob Park hosted six games – three group games involving Switzerland (including the opening match), two quarter-finals, and one semi-final. Torrential rain during the 11 June match left the pitch in such a poor state that the entire grass surface was re-laid, the first time such a decision was made at a tournament of this size.

UEFA Europa League Final 2016

The stadium hosted the 2016 final of the Europa League. Sevilla beat Liverpool 3–1.

This was the first European club final hosted at the stadium, although the previous stadium of the same name, the St. Jakob Stadium, which opened in 1954 for the 1954 FIFA World Cup and closed in 1998, hosted four European Cup Winners' Cup finals in 1969, 1975, 1979 and 1984.

Panorama

International matches

Concerts 
AC/DC performed as the first act at the stadium in July 6, 2001 as part of their Stiff Upper Lip tour.
Metallica also performed at the venue in July 4, 2014 as part of their By Request tour.

See also 
List of football stadiums in Switzerland

References

External links

St. Jakob-Park

Sport in Basel
FC Basel
UEFA Euro 2008 stadiums in Switzerland
Football venues in Basel-Stadt
Buildings and structures in Basel
Herzog & de Meuron buildings
Tourist attractions in Basel
Sports venues completed in 2001
2001 establishments in Switzerland
21st-century architecture in Switzerland